David Remeseiro Salgueiro (born 6 July 1994), known as Jason, is a Spanish professional footballer who plays for Deportivo Alavés as a right winger.

Club career

Levante
Born in A Coruña, Galicia, Jason played for Deportivo de La Coruña's youth setup, where a coach gave him his moniker to distinguish him from two other boys called David; he was nicknamed after British Formula 1 driver Jenson Button because of his speed. Having been released after two seasons, he finished his development at Levante UD. He began playing as a senior with the latter's reserves in 2012–13 in the Segunda División B, and on 1 July 2013 signed a new two-year deal with the club.

On 25 August 2013, Jason made his La Liga debut, playing one minute of a 0–0 home draw against Sevilla FC. On 14 August 2014, he moved to Villarreal CF B on loan.

On 26 January 2015, Jason was recalled by Levante, and was registered with the B side but assigned to the first team. On 31 August, he joined Albacete Balompié of Segunda División on loan for one year. He scored his first goal as a professional on the following 3 January, in a 2–2 draw against SD Ponferradina at the Estadio Carlos Belmonte.

Jason returned to the Estadi Ciutat de València for 2016–17, and scored the game's only goal in an away win over CD Numancia on 21 August 2016. He added a further nine during the campaign, helping his team return to the top flight after one year out.

Valencia

On 1 July 2019, free agent Jason agreed a three-year contract with Valencia CF. On 2 September, however, he was loaned to fellow top-tier club Getafe CF for one year. He featured in just over half of the matches as the team from the Community of Madrid finished in eighth position, and scored once on 26 September in a 3–3 draw away to his parent club.

Jason made his debut for Los Che on 19 September 2020, as a half-time substitute in a 2–1 opening day defeat at RC Celta de Vigo.

Alavés
On 3 January 2022, Jason joined Deportivo Alavés on a three-and-a-half-year contract.

Career statistics

Club

Honours
Levante
Segunda División: 2016–17

References

External links
Levante official profile 

1994 births
Living people
Spanish footballers
Footballers from A Coruña
Association football wingers
La Liga players
Segunda División players
Segunda División B players
Tercera División players
Atlético Levante UD players
Levante UD footballers
Villarreal CF B players
Albacete Balompié players
Valencia CF players
Getafe CF footballers
Deportivo Alavés players